Chaleh Murt or Chalehmurt may refer to:

Chaleh Murt, Hormozgan
Chaleh Murt, Tehran